National Route 329 is a national highway of Japan connecting Nago, Okinawa and Naha, Okinawa in Japan, with a total length of 78.5 km (48.78 mi). The highway forks in Higashionna where the old 329 goes around the cliffs and the Ishikawa By-pass goes through the cliffs via the Ishikawa Tunnel (石川トンネル) and a bridge, all built in the early 1990s.

References

329
Roads in Okinawa Prefecture